Fotis-Fanourios Kouvelis (born 3 September 1948) is a Greek lawyer and leftist politician.

Biography
Kouvelis was born in Volos. He studied law and political science at the University of Athens.

A member of Lambrakis Youth, he was a founding member of the Communist Party of Greece (Interior), serving, from 1975 until the party's demise, on its central committee. He was a founding member of the Greek Left party, in 1987, and was elected its general secretary on 25 June 1989, remaining in this position until 1992. He was Minister for Justice in the 1989 government of Tzannis Tzannetakis. Kouvelis was long time MP from 1989 until 2019.

He was  leader of the Democratic Left party from 27 June 2010 until 7 June 2015. 

From March 2018 he started to support the second Alexis Tsipras government. He became deputy minister of national defence on 28 February 2018 and served as the Minister of Shipping and Island Policy from 29 August 2018 to 9 July 2019.

External links 

 

|-

|-

1948 births
Living people
People from Volos
National and Kapodistrian University of Athens alumni
Coalition of Left, of Movements and Ecology politicians
20th-century Greek lawyers
Greek Left politicians
Greek MPs 1989 (June–November)
Greek MPs 1989–1990
Greek MPs 1990–1993
Greek MPs 2000–2004
Greek MPs 2004–2007
Greek MPs 2007–2009
Greek MPs 2009–2012
Greek MPs 2012 (May)
Justice ministers of Greece
Greek MPs 2012–2014
Members of the Lambrakis Democratic Youth